Alfonso Zvenyika "Mosquito" Lambarda (born 25 November 1975 in Mbare) is a Zimbabwean/Australian professional fly/super fly/bantam/super bantamweight boxer of the 1990s and 2000s who won the Zimbabwe super flyweight title, African Zone 6 Flyweight Title, and Commonwealth light flyweight title, his professional fighting weight varied from , i.e. flyweight to , i.e. super bantamweight.

References

External links

Part 1/3 - Mosquito aka Alphonso Zvenyika - Appealing for assistance. Mbare, Harare, Zimbabwe
Part 2/3 - Mosquito clearing rumours of his death. Mbare, Harare, Zimbabwe
Part 3/3 - Mosquito - Just talking reality topics in the Ghetto. - Mbare, Harare, Zimbabwe

1975 births
Bantamweight boxers
Flyweight boxers
Living people
Sportspeople from Harare
Super-bantamweight boxers
Super-flyweight boxers
Zimbabwean male boxers
Australian male boxers